Black to Blues is the first EP by American band Black Stone Cherry. It was released on September 29, 2017, through Mascot Records.

Track listing

Charts

References

2016 debut EPs
Black Stone Cherry albums
Mascot Records albums
Covers EPs